Valerius Licinianus Licinius (c. 265 – 325) was Roman emperor from 308 to 324. For most of his reign he was the colleague and rival of Constantine I, with whom he co-authored the Edict of Milan, AD 313, that granted official toleration to Christians in the Roman Empire. He was finally defeated at the Battle of Chrysopolis (AD 324), and was later executed on the orders of Constantine I.

Early reign 
Born to a Dacian peasant family in Moesia Superior, Licinius accompanied his close childhood friend, the future emperor Galerius, on the Persian expedition in 298. He was trusted enough by Galerius that in 307 he was sent as an envoy to Maxentius in Italy to attempt to reach some agreement about the latter's illegitimate political position. Galerius then trusted the eastern provinces to Licinius when he went to deal with Maxentius personally after the death of Severus II.

Upon his return to the east Galerius elevated Licinius to the rank of Augustus in the West on 11 November 308, and under his immediate command were the Balkan provinces of Illyricum, Thrace and Pannonia. In 310 he took command of the war against the Sarmatians, inflicting a severe defeat on them. On the death of Galerius in May 311, Licinius entered into an agreement with Maximinus Daza to share the eastern provinces between them. By this point, not only was Licinius the official Augustus of the west but he also possessed part of the eastern provinces as well, as the Hellespont and the Bosporus became the dividing line, with Licinius taking the European provinces and Maximinus taking the Asian.

An alliance between Maximinus and Maxentius forced the two remaining emperors to enter into a formal agreement with each other. So in March 313 Licinius married Flavia Julia Constantia, half-sister of Constantine I, at Mediolanum (now Milan); they had a son, Licinius the Younger, in 315. Their marriage was the occasion for the jointly-issued "Edict of Milan" that reissued Galerius' previous edict allowing Christianity (and any religion one might choose) to be professed in the Empire, with additional dispositions that restored confiscated properties to Christian congregations and exempted Christian clergy from municipal civic duties. The redaction of the edict as reproduced by Lactantius – who follows the text affixed by Licinius in Nicomedia on 14 June 313, after Maximinus' defeat – uses neutral language, expressing a will to propitiate "any Divinity whatsoever in the seat of the heavens".

Daza in the meantime decided to attack Licinius. Leaving Syria with 70,000 men, he reached Bithynia, although harsh weather he encountered along the way had gravely weakened his army. In April 313, he crossed the Bosporus and went to Byzantium, which was held by Licinius' troops. Undeterred, he took the town after an eleven-day siege. He moved to Heraclea, which he captured after a short siege, before moving his forces to the first posting station. With a much smaller body of men, possibly around 30,000, Licinius arrived at Adrianople while Daza was still besieging Heraclea. Before the decisive engagement, Licinius allegedly had a vision in which an angel recited him a generic prayer that could be adopted by all cults and which Licinius then repeated to his soldiers. On 30 April 313, the two armies clashed at the Battle of Tzirallum, and in the ensuing battle Daza's forces were crushed. Ridding himself of the imperial purple and dressing like a slave, Daza fled to Nicomedia. Believing he still had a chance to come out victorious, Daza attempted to stop the advance of Licinius at the Cilician Gates by establishing fortifications there. Unfortunately for Daza, Licinius' army succeeded in breaking through, forcing Daza to retreat to Tarsus, where Licinius continued to press him on land and sea. The war between them ended only with Daza's death in August 313.

Given that Constantine had already crushed his rival Maxentius in 312, the two men decided to divide the Roman world between them. As a result of this settlement, the Tetrarchy was replaced by a system of two emperors, called Augusti: Licinius became Augustus of the East, while his brother-in-law, Constantine, became Augustus of the West.

After making the pact, Licinius rushed immediately to the East to deal with another threat, an invasion by the Persian Sassanid Empire.

Conflict with Constantine I

In 314, a civil war erupted between Licinius and Constantine, in which Constantine used the pretext that Licinius was harbouring Senecio, whom Constantine accused of plotting to overthrow him. Constantine prevailed at the Battle of Cibalae in Pannonia (8 October 314). Although the situation was temporarily settled, with both men sharing the consulship in 315, it was but a lull in the storm. The next year a new war erupted, when Licinius named Valerius Valens co-emperor, only for Licinius to suffer a humiliating defeat on the plains in the Battle of Mardia (also known as the Battle of Campus Ardiensis) in Thrace. The emperors were reconciled after these two battles and Licinius had his co-emperor Valens killed.

Over the next ten years, the two imperial colleagues maintained an uneasy truce. Licinius kept himself busy with a campaign against the Sarmatians in 318, but temperatures rose again in 321 when Constantine pursued some Sarmatians, who had been ravaging some territory in his realm, across the Danube into what was technically Licinius's territory. When he repeated this with another invasion, this time by the Goths who were pillaging Thrace under their leader Rausimod, Licinius complained that Constantine had broken the treaty between them.

Constantine wasted no time going on the offensive. Licinius's fleet of 350 ships was defeated by Constantine's fleet in 323. Then in 324, Constantine, tempted by the "advanced age and unpopular vices" of his colleague, again declared war against him and having defeated his army of 165,000 men at the Battle of Adrianople (3 July 324), succeeded in shutting him up within the walls of Byzantium. The defeat of the superior fleet of Licinius in the Battle of the Hellespont by Crispus, Constantine's eldest son and Caesar, compelled his withdrawal to Bithynia, where a last stand was made; the Battle of Chrysopolis, near Chalcedon (18 September), resulted in Licinius' final submission. In this conflict Licinius was supported by the Gothic prince Alica. Due to the intervention of Flavia Julia Constantia, Constantine's sister and also Licinius' wife, both Licinius and his co-emperor Martinian were initially spared, Licinius being imprisoned in Thessalonica, Martinian in Cappadocia; however, both former emperors were subsequently executed. After his defeat, Licinius attempted to regain power with Gothic support, but his plans were exposed, and he was sentenced to death. While attempting to flee to the Goths, Licinius was apprehended at Thessalonica. Constantine had him hanged, accusing him of conspiring to raise troops among the barbarians.

Character and legacy

As part of Constantine's attempts to decrease Licinius's popularity, he actively portrayed his brother-in-law as a pagan supporter. This may not have been the case; contemporary evidence tends to suggest that he was at least a committed supporter of Christians at one point. He co-authored the Edict of Milan which ended the Great Persecution, and re-affirmed the rights of Christians in his half of the empire. He also added the Christian symbol to his armies, and attempted to regulate the affairs of the Church hierarchy just as Constantine and his successors were to do. His wife was a devout Christian. 

It is even a possibility that he converted. However, Eusebius of Caesarea, writing under the rule of Constantine, charges him with expelling Christians from the Palace and ordering military sacrifices to pagan gods, as well as interfering with the Church's internal procedures and organization. It has been theorized that he originally supported Christians along with Constantine, but later in his life turned against them and to paganism.

Finally, on Licinius's death, his memory was branded with infamy; his statues were thrown down; and by edict, all his laws and judicial proceedings during his reign were abolished.

Family tree

References

Sources
 Grant, Michael (1993), The Emperor Constantine, London. 
 Pears, Edwin. “The Campaign against Paganism A.D. 324.” The English Historical Review, Vol. 24, No. 93 (January 1909): 1–17.
 

260s births
325 deaths
4th-century executions
4th-century murdered monarchs
4th-century Roman consuls
4th-century Roman emperors
Constantinian dynasty
Dacians
Executed Roman emperors
Licinii
People executed by hanging
People executed by the Roman Empire
People from Zaječar District
Tetrarchy
Valerii
Illyrian emperors